Jared Mitchell may refer to:
Jared Mitchell (baseball), former LSU baseball player drafted by the Chicago White Sox
Jared Mitchell (writer), Canadian author and newspaper writer